The large moth family Crambidae contains the following genera beginning with "X":

References 

 X
Crambid